The 2013 SCTV Awards honored the popular in Indonesian television program and music. The ceremony award ceremony held at the JIEXPO Hall D2 in Kemayoran, North Jakarta, on November 29, 2013 and was broadcast on SCTV. It was hosted by Andhika Pratama, Gading Marten, and Senandung Nacita. The ceremony awards was attended by top artists, such as Noah, Syahrini, Afgan, Indah Dewi Pertiwi, Cherrybelle, SM*SH, Cakra Khan, Zaskia Gotik, Wali, and Armada.

Winners and nominees
The nominees were announced on November 4, 2013. The winners are listed on boldface.

References

External links
 Liputan6.com: SCTV Awards

2013 film awards
2013 television awards
2013 music awards
2013 in Indonesian television